Duclos is a surname. Notable people with the surname include:

 Brigitte Duclos (born 1964), Australian television and radio presenter
 Charles Pinot Duclos (1704–1772), a French author
 Gilbert Duclos-Lassalle (born 1954), a former French professional road racing cyclist
 Hervé Duclos-Lassalle (born 1979), a French professional road racing cyclist
 Jacques Duclos (1896–1975), a French Communist politician
 Louis Duclos (born 1939), a Liberal party member of the Canadian House of Commons
 Michelle Duclos (born 1939), a Canadian television performer and supporter of the Front de Libération du Québec
 Pierre Duclos, a French curler
 Pierre-Ludovic Duclos (born 1986), a Canadian former professional tour tennis playe
 Samuel Cottereau du Clos (1598–1685), French chemist
 Jean-Yves Duclos (born 1965), a Canadian Liberal politician

French-language surnames
Surnames of Norman origin